Qeyzaniyeh may refer to:
 Qeyzaniyeh-ye Bozorg
 Qeyzaniyeh-ye Kuchak

See also
 Gheyzaniyeh (disambiguation)